Han Jian (born July 6, 1956 in Liaoning) is a Chinese retired badminton player in the early and mid 1980s when China first entered the International Badminton Federation (now Badminton World Federation).

Career
He was one of the world's leading players in his era, known for his cool and steady play. In China he is nicknamed "sticky candy" (牛皮糖), owing to his much-used tactic of using long rallies to pressurize an opponent into making mistakes. Han won the 1985 IBF World Championships beating Morten Frost in the final. He also won a bronze medal at the 1983 IBF World Championships and played singles for China's world champion Thomas Cup (men's international) teams of 1982 and 1986.

Achievements

World Championships 
Men's singles

World Cup 
Men's singles

Asian Games 
Men's singles

IBF World Grand Prix 
The World Badminton Grand Prix sanctioned by International Badminton Federation (IBF) from 1983 to 2006.

Men's singles

External links
European results
Profile

1956 births
Living people
Badminton players from Shenyang
Asian Games medalists in badminton
Chinese male badminton players
Badminton players at the 1978 Asian Games
Badminton players at the 1982 Asian Games
Medalists at the 1978 Asian Games
Medalists at the 1982 Asian Games
Asian Games gold medalists for China
Asian Games silver medalists for China